The 2022 Grand Prix de Denain – Porte du Hainaut was the 63rd edition of the Grand Prix de Denain one-day road cycling race. It was held on 17 March 2022 as a category 1.Pro race on the 2022 UCI ProSeries calendar. It was also the second event of the 2022 French Road Cycling Cup. After the 2021 edition was postponed to September by COVID-19 precautions, the race returned to its usual spring timeslot.

After riders covered a  circuit to the north of Denain and made the first passage across the finish line, they then took on a larger,  circuit to the south of Denain. After their second passage across the finish line, riders completed two laps of a  circuit that featured  of cobblestones spread across six sections. The last of these sections, from Avesnes-le-Sec to Hordain, concluded  before the finish line.

Early in the stage, a five-rider group went off the front to establish the main breakaway of the race. With around  left, the group began to break up while in the peloton behind, there were several attacks to try and bridge the gap, but the peloton absorbed all of the escapees with around  left. Shortly thereafter, the  trio of Jhonatan Narváez, Magnus Sheffield, and Ben Turner launched another break, and they were joined by Primož Roglič and Damien Touzé. The quintet established a maximum lead of around half a minute before  and  took control at the front of the peloton to close the gap. With under  left, the lead group was brought back by the peloton; Narváez tried another attack but was brought back inside the final kilometre. In the final sprint, Adrien Petit led out the sprint before Max Walscheid emerged from his slipstream in the final  and held off Dries De Bondt for the win.

Teams 
Eight of the 18 UCI WorldTeams, eight UCI ProTeams, and four UCI Continental teams made up the 20 teams that participated in the race. In total, 130 riders started the race, of which 90 finished.

UCI WorldTeams

 
 
 
 
 
 
 
 

UCI ProTeams

 
 
 
 
 
 
 
 

UCI Continental Teams

Result

References

Sources

External links 
  

2022
2022 in French sport
2022 UCI ProSeries
March 2022 sports events in France